Mark Carrier may refer to:

Mark Carrier (safety) (born 1968), American football safety, played for Chicago Bears, Detroit Lions and Washington Redskins
Mark Carrier (wide receiver) (born 1965), American football, played for Tampa Bay Buccaneers, Cleveland Browns and Carolina Panthers